The 1923 New Mexico Lobos football team represented the University of New Mexico as an independent during the 1923 college football season. In their fourth season under head coach Roy W. Johnson, the Lobos compiled a 3–5 record.

Halfback Ogle Jones was the team captain. Jones played for the Lobos from 1921 to 1924 and was recognized in 1949 as "the greatest football player who ever performed for the honor and glory of the University of New Mexico."

The team's tallies of 82 points against  on September 29 and 75 points against Montezuma College on October 15 ranked at the time as second and third highest point totals in school history – trailing only the 108 points scored in 1916 against Arizona State Teachers College at Flagstaff.

Schedule

References

New Mexico
New Mexico Lobos football seasons
New Mexico Lobos football